Nanna Ditzel (October 6, 1923 in Copenhagen - June 17, 2005 in Copenhagen) was a Danish furniture designer.

She studied at the Danish School of Arts and Crafts  and the Royal Danish Academy of Fine Arts in Copenhagen with painter Victor Isbrand, Orla Mølgaard-Nielsen, Peter Hvidt and Kaare Klint  graduating in 1946. Her works include making cabinets, jewelry, tableware and textiles. She also made jewelry designs for Georg Jensen and furniture for Frederica.

Main works 

 Hanging Egg Chair 
 Trinidad chair
 Lulu cradle 
 Nanny Rocking Chair 
 Bench for two 
 Butterfly chair 
 Toad stool and table

Awards 
1956 Lunning Prize
 1991: C. F. Hansen Medal
1998 the lifelong Artists' Grant by the Danish Ministry of Culture

Bibliography 
Nanna Ditzel: ’’ Danish chairs’’, 1954 
Nanna Ditzel: ‘’ Nanna Ditzel, Munkeruphus 1992( Book ) 
Nanna Ditzel: ‘’ Tanker bliver ting : Nanna Ditzel design’’, 1994
Henrik Sten Mller : ‘’Motion and beauty : the book of Nanna Ditzel’’, 1998
Nanna Ditzel: Nanna Ditzel : trapperum; stairscapes; Exhibition Nanna Ditzel Trapperum - Stairscapes Kunstindustrimuseet, 2002
Fabia Masciello : ‘’Nanna Ditzel : design nordico al femminile ‘’, 2003 en Italien 
Hanne Horsfeld: ‘’ Nanna Ditzel’’, 2005

References

External links 
 Nanna Ditzel official web site

1923 births
2005 deaths
Royal Danish Academy of Fine Arts alumni
Danish furniture designers
Danish women designers
Danish modern
Recipients of the C.F. Hansen Medal
Designers from Copenhagen
Burials at Mariebjerg Cemetery